Karin Guthke (born 23 November 1956) is a German diver. She won a bronze medal at the 1980 Summer Olympics in the 3 metre springboard event. She also participated in the 1976 Summer Olympics.

References

1956 births
Living people
Divers from Berlin
German female divers
Olympic divers of East Germany
Divers at the 1976 Summer Olympics
Divers at the 1980 Summer Olympics
Olympic bronze medalists for East Germany
Olympic medalists in diving
Medalists at the 1980 Summer Olympics
20th-century German women
21st-century German women